Arturo Freeman (born October 27, 1976) is a former American football player who played safety for the NFL's Miami Dolphins and New England Patriots. He attended the University of South Carolina for college. Freeman was drafted in the fifth round of the 2000 NFL Draft by the Dolphins. He also signed with the Green Bay Packers briefly.

References 

1976 births
Living people
People from Orangeburg, South Carolina
American football safeties
South Carolina Gamecocks football players
Miami Dolphins players
New England Patriots players